Catherine Isabel Audrey Kidston  (born 6 November 1958) is an English fashion designer, businesswoman and author whose company, Cath Kidston Limited sells home furnishings and related goods online, through franchises and by mail order. She is particularly known for her nostalgic floral patterns and has also published a number of books.

Family background and early life
Kidston's paternal grandparents were Glen Kidston, a successful racing driver for Bentley in the 1920s, and Nancy Soames. Nancy is also Samantha Cameron's paternal grandmother, making them half first cousins.

Television presenters Kirstie Allsopp and Sofie Allsopp are her maternal second cousins, daughters of Charles Allsopp, 6th Baron Hindlip, the former chairman of Christie's.

Career
Kidston opened her first shop in London's Holland Park in 1993, selling hand-embroidered tea-towels and brightly renovated furniture. By the end of 2013, she had 136 outlets, including a flagship store on Piccadilly next to Fortnum & Mason and four stores in China. Appearing on BBC Radio 4's Desert Island Discs programme, Kidston described her shops as provoking a 'Marmite reaction': "People either love it and want a little bit of it very much, or want to stab us." In 2010, she sold a majority stake of the company to private equity investors TA Associates, retaining a minority stake and remaining the company's Creative Director.

Prince George wore one of her outfits, which quickly sold out.

Collaborations
Kidston has worked with Milletts to design tents (2005–6), Nokia/ Carphone Warehouse mobile phones (2006), and Roberts radios (2005 onwards). In 2008, she collaborated with Tesco to produce shopping bags made from plastic bottles, which were sold to raise almost £500,000 for Marie Curie Cancer Care and saved about six million plastic bottles from landfill.

Personal life
Kidston's partner is record producer Hugh Padgham. Kidston has two pets, a Sealyham terrier named Billie and a Lakeland terrier named Stanley, who feature in her designs.

References

Living people
English interior designers
People from Marylebone
People from Test Valley
1958 births
English fashion designers
British women fashion designers
Members of the Order of the British Empire
Writers with dyslexia
Cath